The Jamaica women's national rugby union team are a national sporting side of Jamaica, representing them at rugby union. They played their first sevens international in 2000, and their first test in 2003.

History

Results summary
(Full internationals only)

Results

Full internationals

See also
 Rugby union in Jamaica

External links
 Jamaica Rugby
 Jamaica on IRB.com
 Jamaica  on rugbydata.com

Caribbean women's national rugby union teams
Rugby union in Jamaica
Rugby union